Jose Villanueva III (born January 12, 1982), better known as Quest, is a Filipino singer, rapper and songwriter, known for his song "Sige Lang" in 2012 which is the theme song for the basketball team Gilas Pilipinas.<ref>Quest, “Sige Lang”-Filipino recording artist Jose Villanueva III, better known by his stage name, Quest, Filipino-Christian Blogger Ganns Deen Retrieved September 2012</ref> Quest is a hip-hop and R&B singer wherein he won 'Best Urban Music Video for 2010' at the MYX Awards Philippines for his first single "Back to Love".

Early life
Born Jose Villanueva III on January 12, 1982, in Quezon City, and he is the son of Joel Villanueva (father) and grandson of Jose Villanueva Sr.
Sibling; Ana, Mary Adelene, Ana Cassandra, Michaela, and Nalina Sky. Mother: Diana Villanueva.

Career
Quest honed his craft as a lead vocalist and music ministry director at the Fort location of the Christian church Victory in Manila. He left in 2007 to pursue a full-time career in music. In 2009, Quest started recording Flip Music with Jumbo de Belen without abandoning his contemporary Christian music roots. He soon collaborated with Filipino actor and singer Sam Milby, whom he met in church, in marketing and producing his debut album.

In 2015, Quest signed a recording deal with Warner Music Philippines. His second album, Life of a Champion, was released on May 20, 2016.

Discography

AlbumsRevolution (2010)Life of a Champion (2016)Dream Awake (2019)

EPsPara Sayo'' (2021)

Singles
"Back to Love"
"Party Life"
"Sige Lang"
"Saludo"
 "One Day"
 "No Greater Love" feat. Clara Benin
 "Walang Hanggan"
 "Unang Hakbang"
 "Tagay"
"Sasamahan KIta"
"Permanente" feat. Kiana Valenciano"
"Unang Hakbang" feat. Keiko Necesario
"Kalawakan" feat. Aicelle Santos

Featured singles
"Tao Lang" (with Loonie)
"Dati" (with Sam Concepcion and Tippy Dos Santos)

Awards and nominations

References

External links
 
 
 

21st-century Filipino male singers
Filipino singer-songwriters
Living people
1982 births
People from Las Piñas
Singers from Metro Manila
Warner Music Philippines artists